The Mathieu equation is a linear second-order differential equation with periodic coefficients. The French mathematician, E. Léonard Mathieu, first introduced this family of differential equations, nowadays termed Mathieu equations, in his “Memoir on vibrations of an elliptic membrane” in 1868. "Mathieu functions are applicable to a wide variety of physical phenomena, e.g., diffraction, amplitude distortion, inverted pendulum, stability of a floating body, radio frequency quadrupole, and vibration in a medium with modulated density"

Elliptic-cylinder wavelets 

This is a wide family of wavelet system that provides a multiresolution analysis. The magnitude of the detail and smoothing filters corresponds to first-kind Mathieu functions with odd characteristic exponent. The number of notches of these filters can be easily designed by choosing the characteristic exponent.  Elliptic-cylinder wavelets derived by this method  possess potential application in the fields of optics and electromagnetism due to its symmetry.

Mathieu differential equations 

Mathieu's equation is related to the wave equation for the elliptic cylinder. In 1868, the French mathematician Émile Léonard Mathieu introduced a family of differential equations nowadays termed Mathieu equations.

Given , the Mathieu equation is given by

 

The Mathieu equation is a linear second-order differential equation with periodic coefficients. For q = 0, it reduces to the well-known harmonic oscillator, a being the square of the frequency.

The solution of the Mathieu equation is the elliptic-cylinder harmonic, known as Mathieu functions. They have long been applied on a broad scope of wave-guide problems involving elliptical geometry, including:

 analysis for weak guiding for step index elliptical core optical fibres 
 power transport of elliptical wave guides 
 evaluating radiated waves of elliptical horn antennas 
 elliptical annular microstrip antennas with arbitrary eccentricity ) 
 scattering by a coated strip.

Mathieu functions: cosine-elliptic and sine-elliptic functions 

In general, the solutions of Mathieu equation are not periodic. However, for a given q, periodic solutions exist for infinitely many special values (eigenvalues) of a. It is convenient to distinguish even and odd periodic solutions, which are termed Mathieu functions of first kind.

One of four simpler types can be considered:  Periodic solution ( or ) symmetry (even or odd).

For , the only periodic solutions y corresponding to any characteristic value  or  have the following notations:

ce and se are abbreviations for cosine-elliptic and sine-elliptic, respectively. 
Even periodic solution: 
Odd periodic solution: 

Interesting relationships are found when , :

Figure 1 shows two illustrative waveform of elliptic cosines, whose shape strongly depends on the parameters  and q.

Multiresolution analysis filters and Mathieu's equation 

The equation  , which is known as the dilation or refinement equation, is the chief relation determining a Multiresolution Analysis (MRA).

 is the transfer function of the smoothing filter.

 is the transfer function of the detail filter.

The transfer function of the "detail filter" of a Mathieu wavelet is

 

The transfer function of the "smoothing filter" of a Mathieu wavelet is

 

Therefore,  must be odd.

The magnitude of the transfer function corresponds exactly to the modulus of an elliptic-sine:

Examples of filter transfer function for a Mathieu MRA are shown in the figure 2. The value of a is adjusted to an eigenvalue in each case, leading to a periodic solution. Such solutions present a number of  zeroes in the interval .

The G and H filter coefficients of Mathieu MRA can be expressed in terms of the values  of the Mathieu function as:

 

 

There exist recurrence relations among the coefficients:

 

 

It is straightforward to show that   , .

Waveform of Mathieu wavelets 

Mathieu wavelets can be derived from the lowpass reconstruction filter by the cascade algorithm. Infinite Impulse Response filters (IIR filter) should be use since Mathieu wavelet has no compact support. Figure 3 shows emerging pattern that progressively looks like the wavelet's shape. Depending on the parameters a and q some waveforms (e.g. fig. 3b) can present a somewhat unusual shape.

References 

Wavelets